Que la fête commence... (English title Let Joy Reign Supreme) is a 1975 French film directed by Bertrand Tavernier and starring Philippe Noiret. It is a historical drama set during the 18th century French Régence centring on the Breton Pontcallec Conspiracy.

It won the French Syndicate of Cinema Critics Prix Méliès, and the César Award for Best Director, Best Supporting Actor, Best Writing and Best Production Design, and was nominated for Best Film, Best Supporting Actress and Best Music.

Plot 
In France in 1719, Philippe II, Duke of Orléans is the regent for the young Louis XV. He is sophisticated, gentle, a liberal and a libertine. He endeavours to keep his subjects cultured and happy—mainly to stop the peasants from rising up—but he knows he has no real royal authority. To assist him, Philippe enlists the aid of an atheistic and venal priest named Guillaume Dubois, another libertine who does not care for anyone except himself. The film begins with the gruesome autopsy of Marie Louise Élisabeth d'Orléans, Duchess of Berry, elder daughter of the Regent who died on 21 July 1719, her health fatally ruined by her debauched life and a series of clandestine pregnancies. Notoriously promiscuous, Joufflotte ("chubby")—as she was nicknamed because of her generous proportions—was rumoured to have committed incest with her father. The autopsy reveals that the Rubenesque princess was again pregnant. Philippe is very much affected by her death. Meanwhile, a rebellion led by a Breton squire named Pontcallec occurs. Philippe's natural idealism is further shaken when he is forced to execute Pontcallec's band of revolutionaries. Dubois, however, tries to take advantage of the revolt and subsequent famine to become archbishop. It becomes apparent that true joy will only be found when the peasants successfully overthrow the aristocrats who have held them down for so long.

The film provides a description of 18th century life at court, and features the music of the real Philippe d'Orléans.

Cast 
Philippe Noiret - Philippe d'Orléans
Jean Rochefort - L'abbé Dubois
Jean-Pierre Marielle - Le marquis de Pontcallec
Christine Pascal - Emilie
Alfred Adam - Villeroi
Jean-Roger Caussimon - Le cardinal
Gérard Desarthe - Duke of Bourbon
Michel Beaune - Le capitaine La Griollais
Monique Chaumette - La gouvernante de Pontcallec
François Dyrek - Montlouis
Jean-Paul Farré - Le père Burdo
Nicole Garcia - La Fillon
Raymond Girard - Chirac
Jacques Hilling - L'abbé Gratellard
Bernard La Jarrige - Amaury de Lambilly
Hélène Vincent - Madame de Saint-Simon
Michel Blanc - Le valet de chambre de Louis XV
Christian Clavier - Le valet de l'auberge / Pickpocket
Thierry Lhermitte - Count of Horn

Awards and nominations 
César Awards (France)
Won: Best Actor – Supporting Role (Jean Rochefort)
Won: Best Director (Bertrand Tavernier)
Won: Best Production Design (Pierre Guffroy)
Won: Best Writing (Jean Aurenche and Bertrand Tavernier)
Nominated: Best Actress – Supporting Role (Christine Pascal)
Nominated: Best Film
Nominated: Best Music (Philippe d'Orléans and Antoine Duhamel)
French Syndicate of Cinema Critics (France)
Won: Best Film (Bertrand Tavernier)

References

External links 
 
 

1975 films
1970s historical films
French historical films
Films whose director won the Best Director César Award
Films featuring a Best Supporting Actor César Award-winning performance
Films directed by Bertrand Tavernier
Films set in the 1710s
Films with screenplays by Jean Aurenche
1970s French-language films
1970s French films